"Work It" is a single by American rapper Nelly featuring American singer Justin Timberlake. It was released on February 24, 2003, as the fourth single from Nelly's 2002 album, Nellyville. It peaked at number 68 on the Billboard Hot 100, and number seven on the UK Singles Chart.

Critical reception
Tom Sinclair of Entertainment Weekly panned the collaboration, stating that the song was one of the weaker tracks in Nellyville despite the inclusion of Justin Timberlake. Dele Fadele of NME described it as a "silly pop-directed collaboration with Justin Timberlake of *N Sync." Writing for PopMatters, Wayne Franklin noted that Timberlake croons on the song.

Commercial performance
"Work It" peaked at number 68 on the Billboard Hot 100 on the March 13, 2004, issue of Billboard, charting for five weeks. It also peaked at number seven on the UK Singles Chart on March 15, 2003, spending 11 weeks on the chart.

Music video

The music video for "Work It" shows Justin and Nelly visiting the Playboy Mansion where they play tennis and meet many of the Playboy Playmates. Hugh Hefner also makes an appearance. It was directed by Joseph Kahn and released in 2003.

Other versions and in popular culture
The song was remixed by Scott Storch remix and was included on Nelly's 2003 remix album Da Derrty Versions: The Reinvention. Another remix by Jason Nevins sampled AC/DC's 1980 single "Back in Black", which received considerable airplay, but was not officially released. The "Nevins Universal Dub" remix was played in the viral internet sensation clip of Robin Schreiber dancing at the Golden State Warriors basketball game on November 9, 2016

Track listing

UK CD single

UK 12-inch single

UK remix CD single

European CD single

Canadian CD single

Charts

Certifications

Release history

References

2002 songs
2003 singles
Justin Timberlake songs
Music videos directed by Joseph Kahn
Nelly songs
Universal Records singles
Songs written by Nelly
Songs written by Justin Timberlake
Songs written by Jay E